Colutea orientalis is a species of leguminous shrub native to Europe and Asia. It is a deciduous, grey-leafed, bushy shrub that grows to a height of up to 2 m (6 ft). It bears clusters of small yellow and coppery-red flowers in summer, followed by green seed pods. Colutea × media is a hybrid between C. orientalis and C. arborescens.

Sources 
 
 
  
 

Galegeae
Taxa named by Philip Miller